Mount Lorne is a hamlet in Canada's Yukon. The hamlet is considered a local advisory area with an advisory council providing local government.

Mount Lorne is located just south of Whitehorse, comprising rural residential areas along the South Klondike Highway, the Annie Lake Road and connecting sideroads. It is part of the Whitehorse Census Agglomeration. Eighty-seven per cent of the population is non-aboriginal.

Demographics 

References

External links
Mount Lorne, Yukon

Hamlets in Yukon